Johann Christoph Wolf (born at Wernigerode, February 21 1683; died at Hamburg, July 25 1739) was a German Christian Hebraist, polyhistor, and collector of books.

He studied at Wittenberg, and traveled in Holland and England in the interest of science, coming in contact with Campeius Vitringa, Willem Surenhuis, Adriaan Reland, Jacques Basnage, and others. He especially occupied himself with the study of Oriental languages and literature, of which he became professor at the Hamburg gymnasium in 1712.

At this time the Oppenheimer Collection was housed at Hamburg, and Wolf determined to devote himself to a description of Jewish literature based upon this collection. His researches resulted in Bibliotheca Hebræa (4 vols., Hamburg, 1715–33), the first volume of which contains a list of Jewish authors, while the second deals with the subject matter under the headings "Bible," "Talmud," "Cabala," etc. The knowledge of Christendom about the Talmud was for nearly a century and a half derived from Wolf's statements. Vol. iii. is a supplement to vol. i.; vol. iv. to vol. ii.

Wolf's work forms the basis of Steinschneider's catalogue of the Bodleian Library, which has references to it on nearly every page. Besides this work he issued a history of Hebrew lexicons (for his doctor's dissertation; Wittenberg, 1705), and "Notitia Karæorum" (Hamburg, 1721).

Wolf owned a big library of 25,000 volumes, books and oriental manuscripts. Among other things, he acquired the collection of the Frankfurter councillor Zacharias Conrad von Uffenbach.

Selected works 
 Curae philologicae et criticae in Novum Testamentum Basilee 1741.

References
 Moritz Steinschneider, Bibliographisches Handbuch, 1859, pp. xviii. et seq. 
 Steinschneider, Catalogus Librorum Hebræorum in Bibliotheca Bodleiana col. 2730; 
 Julius Fürst, Bibliotheca Judaica iii. 528 
 John McClintock and James Strong, Cyclopedia of Biblical, Theological and Ecclesiastical Literature

1683 births
1739 deaths
German scholars
Christian Hebraists
Book and manuscript collectors